Moni Helena Nilsson Brännström (born Nilsson 24 February 1955 in Stockholm) is a Swedish author, best known for the books about the boy Tsatsiki. Earlier she owned the 17th chair of the Swedish Academy for Children's Books. She is one of the initiators of the young-adult-culture-house Palatset in Stockholm.

Selected bibliography
1977 – Villa 78
1983 – Bartolomeus och spöket (illustrator: Pija Lindenbaum)
1995 – Tsatsiki och morsan (illustrator: Pija Lindenbaum)
1996 – Tsatsiki och farsan (illustrator: Pija Lindenbaum)
1997 – Bara Tsatsiki (illustrator: Pija Lindenbaum)
1998 – Sejtes skatt (Fantasy book)
1998 – Riddarpojken (together with Boel Werner)
1999 – Tsatsiki och kärleken (illustrator: Pija Lindenbaum)
2001 – Tsatsiki och Retzina (illustrator: Pija Lindenbaum)
2001 – Klassresan
2002 – Smått och gott med Samuel Svensson (illustrator: Kiran Maini Gerhandsson)
2003 – Malin + Rasmus = sant: en fristående fortsättning på Klassresan
2005 – Salmiak och Spocke (illustrator:Lisen Adbåge)
2006 – Salmiak och Hedda: det femte hålet (illustrator: Lisen Adbåge)
2007 – Hoppet: Jumpin' Jack Az

Selected awards
1997, 1999, 2001 & 2003 – Bokjuryn
1998 – Nils Holgersson Plaque (for the book Bara Tsatsiki)
1999 – BMF Plaque (for the book Tsatsiki och kärleken)
1999 – Wettergrens barnbokollon

References

External links

Official website

Living people
1955 births
Writers from Stockholm
Swedish fantasy writers
Swedish children's writers
Swedish women children's writers
Swedish-language writers